KJNP-FM (100.3 FM) is a radio station licensed to serve North Pole, Alaska. The station is owned by Evangelistic Alaska Missionary Fellowship. It airs a Religious radio format.

KJNP-FM was founded by Don & Gen Nelson. The station was assigned the KJNP-FM call letters by the Federal Communications Commission on January 26, 1981.

Translators

References

External links
KJNP-FM official website

Moody Radio affiliate stations
JNP-FM
North Pole, Alaska